Jean Briane (20 October 1930 – 3 December 2021) was a French politician. A member of the Union for French Democracy, he served Aveyron's 1st constituency in the National Assembly from 1971 to 2002.

References

1930 births
2021 deaths
People from Aveyron
Union for French Democracy politicians
Deputies of the 5th National Assembly of the French Fifth Republic
Deputies of the 6th National Assembly of the French Fifth Republic
Deputies of the 7th National Assembly of the French Fifth Republic
Deputies of the 8th National Assembly of the French Fifth Republic
Deputies of the 9th National Assembly of the French Fifth Republic
Deputies of the 10th National Assembly of the French Fifth Republic
Deputies of the 11th National Assembly of the French Fifth Republic